Hazelwood is a historic house in Green Bay, Wisconsin.

History
Morgan Lewis Martin had the house built for he and his new wife, Elizabeth, in what was then known as Fort Howard in 1837. A cousin of noted politician James Duane Doty, Martin had previously been a territorial legislator of the Michigan Territory. In the years soon after his marriage, Martin became a member of the legislature of the Wisconsin Territory and would serve as a Congressional Delegate to the United States House of Representatives representing the territory.

Martin was a key player in the drafting of the Constitution of Wisconsin and Wisconsin was admitted as a state in 1848. Much of Martin's work on the document was done at Hazelwood. He would eventually serve in the Wisconsin State Assembly, the Wisconsin State Senate and as a Brown County, Wisconsin judge.

Hazelwood was added to the National Register of Historic Places in 1970 and to the State Register of Historic Places in 1989. Also in 1989, Hazelwood was bought by the Brown County Historical Association, which would base its operations out of the house. It was also turned into a museum.

See also
List of the oldest buildings in Wisconsin

References

Houses on the National Register of Historic Places in Wisconsin
National Register of Historic Places in Brown County, Wisconsin
Museums on the National Register of Historic Places
Historic house museums in Wisconsin
Museums in Brown County, Wisconsin
Greek Revival houses in Wisconsin
Houses completed in 1837